Rocío Espinosa López-Cepero (18 February 1931 – 17 March 2023), known professionally as Laura Valenzuela, or Laurita Valenzuela in her beginnings, was a Spanish television presenter, actress and model. She was one of the first television presenters in Spain appearing in the early broadcasts of Televisión Española (TVE). In 1969, she hosted the Eurovision Song Contest held in Madrid.

Valenzuela received the Iris Lifetime Achievement Award presented by the Spanish Television Academy in 2012.

Biography
Born in Seville on 18 February 1931, her first job was in a store in Madrid as a haute couture model. She made her film debut in 1954 and she was one of the first television presenters in Spain when Televisión Española (TVE) was launched in 1956. Between 1968 and 1970 she co-hosted with Joaquín Prat the musical show Galas del Sábado. She became known in Europe for hosting 1969 edition of the Eurovision Song Contest held in Madrid. In 1970, she co-hosted, also with Prat, the second Festival de la Canción Española that was used as the Spanish national selection for Eurovision that year.

Valenzuela starred in many films from the early 1950s up through the late 1960s. In 1971, when she married film director José Luis Dibildos, she retired from public life and had her daughter, presenter Lara Dibildos. She returned to television in 1990 to host Tele 5 ¿dígame? on Telecinco. She also hosted for that channel the broadcast of the New Year's clock bell strikes live from Puerta del Sol in Madrid to welcome 1991 and 1992. Later on, in 1996, she returned to TVE with the show Mañanas de primera.

Valenzuela retired again in the 2000s when she was treated for breast cancer. She recovered but remained retired, apart from occasional collaborations and appearances, such as on 7 December 2006, when she hosted the special show Gala 50 años de TVE, which celebrated the 50th anniversary of TVE, alongside Anne Igartiburu and Paula Vázquez.

Valenzuela died from complications of Alzheimer's disease at La Princesa Hospital in Madrid, on 17 March 2023. She was 92.

Selected filmography

Film 
 High Fashion (1954)
 The Fisher of Songs (1954)
 It Happened in Seville (1955)
 The Tenant (1957)
 The Violet Seller (1958)
 Los tramposos (1959)
 Three Ladies (1960)
 Madame (1961)
 Eva 63 (1963)
 The Daughters of Helena (1963)
 Cyrano and d'Artagnan (1964)
 The Black Tulip (1964)
 Hagan juego, señoras (1964)
 Las noches de Monsieur Max (1966)
 Z7 Operation Rembrandt (1966)
 Amor a la española (1966)
 Demasiadas mujeres para Layton (1967)
 Las que tienen que servir (1967)
 Los subdesarrollados (1968)
 La dinamita está servida (1968)
 De profesión, sus labores (1969)
 Growing Leg, Diminishing Skirt (1970)
 Spaniards in Paris (1971)

 Television 
 Galas del sábado (1968–1970) – TVE – Host with Joaquín Prat.
 Contamos contigo (1968) – TVE – Host with Joaquín Prat.
 Eurovision Song Contest 1969 – TVE and EBU – Host.
 Festival de la Canción Española 1970 – TVE – Host with Joaquín Prat.
 Tele 5 ¿dígame? (1990–1992) – Telecinco – Host with Javier Basilio, Paloma Lago and Nati Abascal.
 Gala 50 años de TVE (2006) – TVE – Host with Anne Igartiburu and Paula Vázquez.

 Accolades 

See also
 List of Eurovision Song Contest presenters

References

External links
 
 La vida de Laura Valenzuela, en fotos, Valenzuela photos at El País''
Laura Valenzuela, the first presenter in Spain

1931 births
2023 deaths 
Deaths from Alzheimer's disease 
Deaths from dementia in Spain
People from Seville
Spanish film actresses
Spanish television actresses
Spanish television presenters
Spanish female models
20th-century Spanish actresses
Spanish women television presenters